Taschereau is a provincial electoral district in the Capitale-Nationale region of Quebec, Canada that elects members to the National Assembly of Quebec. It consists of part of the La Cité-Limoilou borough of Quebec City and the tiny enclave of Notre-Dame-des-Anges.

It was created for the 1973 election from parts of Jean-Talon and Saint-Sauveur electoral districts.

In the change from the 2001 to the 2011 electoral map, it lost territory to Jean-Lesage and Vanier-Les Rivières but gained territory from Jean-Talon.

The district is named after former Quebec Premier Louis-Alexandre Taschereau who served as premier from 1920 to 1936.

Members of the National Assembly
This riding has elected the following Members of the National Assembly:

Election results

* Result compared to Action démocratique

References

External links
Information
 Elections Quebec

Election results
 Election results (National Assembly)
 Election results (QuébecPolitique)

Maps
 2011 map (PDF)
 2001 map (Flash)
2001–2011 changes (Flash)
1992–2001 changes (Flash)
 Electoral map of Capitale-Nationale region
 Quebec electoral map, 2011

Provincial electoral districts of Quebec City
Taschereau